Truman Dudley Allen (1829-1897), commonly known as T. D. Allen or T. Dudley Allen, was an American architect. He moved frequently throughout his career, practicing in Iowa, Minnesota, Nebraska, Ohio and Wisconsin, but most of his prominent works date from his residence in Minneapolis at the close of his career.

Early life and career
Truman Dudley Allen was born April 16, 1829 in Greenwich, New York. In 1848 he moved to western Pennsylvania, where he began to study architecture. He continued these studies in northern Ohio, eventually starting an architectural practice in Medina. In 1872 he went to Cleveland, but soon afterwards went further west, to Oshkosh, Wisconsin, and then Council Bluffs, Iowa. He remained there until 1879, when he relocated to Grand Island, Nebraska. He then went to Lincoln in 1882, where he remained until 1885. Later that year he was in Anoka, Minnesota, and was in Minneapolis by 1886.

When he arrived in Minneapolis he associated himself with A. Leonard Haley, who had initiated his practice in Minneapolis in late 1885. Haley & Allen lasted for only a few months, and by 1887 was instead associated with Homer L. Patten, though Allen & Patten too only lasted a few months. In about 1892 Allen began practicing as T. D. Allen & Company, and retired in 1893, when ill health obligated it. He spent a year in Florida before coming back west to Racine, Wisconsin, to live with his daughter, Wrennie, and her husband. He died in Racine, October 7, 1897.

Personal life
In 1866 Allen married Harriet E. Hinckley of Warren County, Pennsylvania. They had four children, and Harriet Allen died in Grand Island in 1880. In 1882 he remarried, to Lucinda Thorspeckan of Omaha, though she may have died by 1885. He married a third time in 1886, to Carrie E. Mullekin of St. Paul.

One of his sons, Glenn Allen, would go on to be a successful architect in Texas and California.

In 1891 Allen's daughter, Wrennie, married David R. Davis, an employee of her father's. In 1892 they moved to Racine, Wisconsin, where Davis established his own practice. Allen was living with his daughter and son-in-law at the time of his death.

Legacy
A number of his works are listed on the U.S. National Register of Historic Places.

Reception
If Allen's work was ever substantially noted in the national architectural press, it is not apparent. In the twentieth century, several writers have commented on his later works in the Richardsonian Romanesque style. In their contribution to a 1978 study of American courthouse architecture, Henry-Russell Hitchcock and William Seale found Allen's courthouses of the 1880s and 1890s to be "crass and vulgar...very remote from Richardson's own work," which sets the tone. This is echoed by Kathryn Bishop Eckert in her 2000 study of sandstone architecture around Lake Superior, noting in particular an impression of a lack of planning.

In their 1993 survey of the architecture of Iowa, David Gebhard and Gerald Mansheim are more diplomatic, instead calling Allen's approach "rather personal." They identify the Franklin County Courthouse (1890) as a high point.

Architectural works

Notes

External links
 "Truman Dudley Allen (1829-1897)," Place Makers of Nebraska: The Architects, Nebraska State Historical Society.

References

Architects from New York (state)
Architects from Ohio
Architects from Cleveland
Architects from Wisconsin
Architects from Iowa
Architects from Nebraska
Architects from Minnesota
Architects from Minneapolis
19th-century American architects
1829 births
1897 deaths